Leonard Marson (22 August 1918 – December 1994) was an English professional rugby league footballer who played in the 1930s, 1940s and 1950s.

Background
Len Marson's birth was registered in Hemsworth district, West Riding of Yorkshire, England, and he died aged 76.

Playing career

International honours
Len Marson won a cap for England while at Wakefield Trinity in 1949 against France.

County Honours
Len Marson was selected for Yorkshire County XIII whilst at Wakefield Trinity during the 1947/48, 1948/49, 1949/50 and 1950/51 seasons.

Challenge Cup Final appearances
Len Marson played  in Wakefield Trinity's 13-12 victory over Wigan in the 1946 Challenge Cup Final during the 1945–46 season at Wembley Stadium, London on Saturday 4 May 1946, in front of a crowd of 54,730.

County Cup Final appearances
Len Marson played  in Wakefield Trinity's 9-12 defeat by Featherstone Rovers in the 1940 Yorkshire County Cup Final during the 1939–40 season at Odsal Stadium, Bradford on Saturday 22 June 1940, played  in the 2-5 defeat by Bradford Northern in the 1945 Yorkshire County Cup Final during the 1945–46 season at Thrum Hall, Halifax on Saturday 3 November 1945, played  in the 10-0 victory over Hull F.C. in the 1946 Yorkshire County Cup Final during the 1946–47 season at Headingley Rugby Stadium, Leeds on Saturday 31 November 1946, played  in the 7-7 draw with  Leeds in the 1947 Yorkshire County Cup Final during the 1947–48 Northern season at Fartown Ground, Huddersfield on Saturday 1 November 1947, and played , and scored a try in the 8-7 victory over Leeds in the 1947 Yorkshire County Cup Final replay during the 1947–48 Northern season at Odsal Stadium, Bradford on Wednesday 5 November 1947.

Club career
Len Marson made his début for Wakefield Trinity on Sunday 5 November 1939, he appears to have scored no drop-goals (or field-goals as they are currently known in Australasia), but prior to the 1974–75 season all goals, whether; conversions, penalties, or drop-goals, scored 2-points, consequently prior to this date drop-goals were often not explicitly documented, therefore '0' drop-goals may indicate drop-goals not recorded, rather than no drop-goals scored. In addition, prior to the 1949–50 season, the archaic field-goal was also still a valid means of scoring points.

Testimonial match
Len Marson's Testimonial match at Wakefield Trinity took place in 1951.

Contemporaneous article extract
"Joined Wakefield Trinity 1939 from Fitzwilliam Intermediates and played in various pack positions before taking over the hooking berth from Victor "Vic" Darlison. Gained Yorkshire County honours and was considered by many to be most unfortunate in not making at least one tour to Australia".

Genealogical information
Len Marson's marriage to Maud (née Hepton) was registered during fourth ¼ 1939 in Hemsworth district They had children; Stewart L. Marson (birth registered during second ¼  in Hemsworth district), Maureen Marson (birth registered during first ¼  in Hemsworth district), and David Marson (birth registered during second ¼  in Lower Agbrigg district).

References

External links

1918 births
1994 deaths
England national rugby league team players
English rugby league players
Hunslet F.C. (1883) players
People from Hemsworth
Place of death missing
Rugby league hookers
Rugby league locks
Rugby league players from Wakefield
Wakefield Trinity players
Yorkshire rugby league team players